Kazarina is a rural locality (a village) in Leninskoye Rural Settlement, Kudymkarsky District, Perm Krai, Russia. The population was 55 as of 2010.

Geography 
Kazarina is located 20 km south of Kudymkar (the district's administrative centre) by road. Verkh-Yusva is the nearest rural locality.

References 

Rural localities in Kudymkarsky District